The 1952 Davis Cup was the 41st edition of the most important tournament between national teams in men's tennis. 23 teams entered in the Europe Zone, 5 teams entered in the America Zone, and India was the sole competitor in the new Eastern Zone.

The United States defeated Canada in the America Zone final, and Italy defeated Belgium in the Europe Zone final. In the Inter-Zonal Zone, Italy defeated India in the semifinal, and then lost to the United States in the final. In the Challenge Round the United States fell to the defending champions Australia. The final was played at the Memorial Drive Park in Adelaide, Australia on 29–31 December.

America Zone

Draw

Final
Canada vs. United States

Europe Zone

Draw

Final
Italy vs. Belgium

Inter-Zonal Zone

Draw

Semifinals
Italy vs. India

Final
United States vs. Italy

Challenge Round
Australia vs. United States

References

External links
Davis Cup official website

 
Davis Cups by year
Davis Cup
Davis Cup
Davis Cup
Davis Cup